The Varsity is the official student newspaper of the University of Toronto, in publication since 1880.

The paper publishes weekly on all campuses during the fall and winter semesters and online throughout the year, along with two seasonal magazines.

Originally a broadsheet daily, it now issues in compact form. The paper's primary focus is on campus affairs and local news.

The Varsity usually assumes a left-wing stance on political affairs, but equally hosts columnists that skew right-of-centre. The paper is published by Varsity Publications, a not-for-profit corporation, and is primarily financed by advertisement revenues with subsidies from a student levy.

History
At the height of debate on coeducation in 1880, The Varsity published an article in its inaugural issue voicing in favour of admitting women.

In 1895, the suspension of The Varsitys editor, James Tucker, led Latin Professor Dale to publicly attack the administration in The Globe, which in turn led to his own dismissal. University College students then approved a motion by Varsity staff member William Lyon Mackenzie King and boycotted lectures for a week. This is significant for William Lyon Mackenzie King's involvement as a member of the Varsity editorial staff and student leader. He would later become Canada's longest serving Prime Minister.

After Prime Minister Pierre Trudeau decriminalized homosexuality in 1969, a medical research assistant placed an advertisement in The Varsity seeking volunteers to establish the first university homophile association in Canada.

In 2017, The Varsity began publishing a Chinese-language edition of the newspaper on their website.

Notable past staff
Peter Gzowski, broadcaster and reporter, host of CBC's Morningside (1982–1997)
Michael Ignatieff, public intellectual, academic at the John F. Kennedy School of Government, Member of Parliament, and former Leader of the Liberal Party of Canada
Michael Kesterton, columnist for The Globe and Mail
William Lyon Mackenzie King, 10th Prime Minister of Canada
Mark Kingwell, professor of the University of Toronto, senior fellow of Massey College
Naomi Klein, journalist, author of No Logo and The Shock Doctrine
David Megginson, computer software developer
Chandler Levack, writer and filmmaker
Graham F. Scott, managing editor of Canadian Business
Dennis Choquette, national editor of The Globe and Mail
Linda McQuaig, Toronto Star columnist
Tom Walkom, Toronto Star columnist
Bob Rae, Rhodes Scholar, 21st Premier of Ontario, Member of Parliament
Edward Roberts, 11th Lieutenant Governor of Newfoundland and Labrador
Frank Shuster and Johnny Wayne, comedians, best known for their work as comedy duo Wayne and Shuster
Isabel Vincent, journalist for the National Post, former correspondent for The Globe and Mail
Clive Thompson, journalist and science and technology writer for Wired (magazine)
Conan Tobias, editor of Taddle Creek
Barbara Amiel, journalist, Maclean's columnist
Jason Szep, Pulitzer Prize winner and International Affairs Editor with Reuters
James Laxer, political economist

See also
List of student newspapers in Canada
List of newspapers in Canada

References

External links
 The Varsity

Student newspapers published in Ontario
University of Toronto
Newspapers published in Toronto
Newspapers established in 1880
Canadian University Press
Weekly newspapers published in Ontario
1880 establishments in Ontario